Neziha Labidi is a Tunisian politician. She served as Minister of Women, Family and Children in the cabinet of Prime Minister Youssef Chahed.

She graduated at University of Paris 1 Pantheon-Sorbonne in 1979.

References 

Living people
Year of birth missing (living people)
Place of birth missing (living people)
21st-century Tunisian politicians
21st-century Tunisian women politicians
Government ministers of Tunisia
Women government ministers of Tunisia